Christopher Young (26 May 1886 – 22 October 1956) was an English professional footballer who played for Grimsby Town, Gainsborough Trinity, Tottenham Hotspur and Port Vale. A prolific forward, he twice finished as Port Vale's top-scorer, and once scored a club record seven goals in one game.

Career
Starting his career with Grimsby Rovers, Cleethorpes Town (in two spells), Grimsby Town (Football League Second Division), Gainsborough Trinity and Tottenham Hotspur (Football League First Division), Young joined Port Vale in the summer of 1913.

Young finished as the club's top-scorer in 1913–14 and 1914–15 with 37 and 40 goals respectively. He scored a club record seven goals in one game, when he put seven past Burton Rangers in the Birmingham Senior Cup First Round on 21 September 1914. He also put five past the Blackpool Reserves in a Central League match on 2 January 1915. He helped Vale to the North Staffordshire Infirmary Cup title in 1915, before moving back to Grimsby Town as Vale went into abeyance due to the war. As Vale returned, so did Young, albeit for only one appearance. He re-signed in February 1919, but before making a return he picked up an injury which seems to have ended his career.

Career statistics
Source:

References

1886 births
1956 deaths
People from Cleethorpes
English footballers
Association football forwards
Grimsby Town F.C. players
Gainsborough Trinity F.C. players
Tottenham Hotspur F.C. players
Port Vale F.C. players
English Football League players